The 2019–20 season was Lille OSC's 76th season in existence and the club's 20th consecutive season in the top flight of French football. In addition to the domestic league, Lille participated in this season's edition of the Coupe de France, the Coupe de la Ligue, and the UEFA Champions League. The season covered the period from 1 July 2019 to 30 June 2020.

The club made their first appearance in the UEFA Champions League since 2012.

Players

Squad information
Players and squad numbers last updated on 13 August 2019. Appearances include league matches only.Note: Flags indicate national team as has been defined under FIFA eligibility rules. Players may hold more than one non-FIFA nationality.

Transfers

In

Loans in

Out

Loans out

Pre-season and friendlies

Competitions

Overview

Ligue 1

League table

Results summary

Results by round

Matches
The Ligue 1 schedule was announced on 14 June 2019. The Ligue 1 matches were suspended by the LFP on 13 March 2020 due to COVID-19 until further notices. On 28 April 2020, it was announced that Ligue 1 and Ligue 2 campaigns would not resume, after the country banned all sporting events until September. On 30 April, The LFP ended officially the 2019–20 season.

Coupe de France

Coupe de la Ligue

UEFA Champions League

Group stage

Group H

Statistics

Appearances and goals

|-
! colspan=14 style=background:#dcdcdc; text-align:center| Goalkeepers

|-
! colspan=14 style=background:#dcdcdc; text-align:center| Defenders

|-
! colspan=14 style=background:#dcdcdc; text-align:center| Midfielders

|-
! colspan=14 style=background:#dcdcdc; text-align:center| Forwards

|-
! colspan=14 style=background:#dcdcdc; text-align:center| Players transferred out during the season

Goalscorers

Last updated: 8 March 2020

Clean sheets

Disciplinary record

Last updated: 1 September 2019

References

Lille OSC seasons
Lille OSC